Rocket Man, Rocketman, etc., may refer to:

Fiction and literature
 Rocket Man (manga), a detective fiction manga by Motohiro Katou
 "Rocketman!!", a chapter of the manga series One Piece
 "The Rocket Man", a short story by Ray Bradbury, collected in The Illustrated Man
 "Rocketman", an identity adopted by the character Tyrone Slothrop in Thomas Pynchon's novel Gravity's Rainbow

Film and television
 The Rocket Man (film), 1954 comedy film
 RocketMan, a 1997 science-fiction comedy film
 Rocket Man (TV series), a 2005 UK drama series starring Robson Green
 "Rocket Man" (Law & Order: Criminal Intent), a 2007 episode
 Rocketman (film), 2019 film about Elton John
 Rocketman: Mad Mike's Mission to Prove the Flat-Earth, a 2019 documentary about "Mad" Mike Hughes

Music
 "Rocket Man" (song), a 1972 song by Elton John and Bernie Taupin
 Rocket Man: The Definitive Hits, a 2007 album by Elton John
 Rocket Man: Greatest Hits Live, a 2007–2010 tour by Elton John
 "Rocket Man", a 1962 song by The Spotnicks the main melody of which is taken from the Russian song "Polyushko-polye"
 "Rocket Man", a 1970 song by Pearls Before Swine, based on the Bradbury short story
 ROCKETMAN, stage name of Japanese musician Ryo Fukawa

People with the nickname Rocket Man
 Azizulhasni Awang (born 1988), Malaysian track cyclist, nicknamed the "Pocket Rocketman" due to his small stature
 Kim Jong-un (born ~1982-1984), the third Supreme Leader of North Korea
 Ryan Newman (born 1977), NASCAR Cup Series driver
 Joe Rokocoko (born 1983), New Zealand rugby union player
 Yves Rossy (born 1959), Swiss aviator and inventor of a fixed-wing jet pack
 Larry Schultz (1950–2011), American founder of Rocket Yoga

Other uses
 Astronaut, sometimes nicknamed a rocket man
 King of the Rocket Men

See also
 Rocketeer